Plasan (incorporated as Plasan Sasa Ltd. and formerly as Plasan Sasa (ACS) Ltd.) is an Israeli based vehicle manufacturer.

History
Plasan Sasa was established in 1985, and develops, manufactures, and assembles custom-built vehicle armor systems and chassis up-armor designs as well as Add-On Armor Protection Kits for lightweight military tactical trucks and APCs [Wheeled & Tracked], for fixed and rotary wing aircraft, commercial vehicles, and is a major supplier of personnel protection armor.

Plasan is a non-public company and is wholly owned by Kibbutz Sasa, a communal village of some 100 families in Northern Israel. It employs 1,300 people, including 650 in the United States and 180 in France.

Plasan armor is widely used in the  US military's MRAP vehicles. US Ambassador to Israel Dan Shapiro said that Plasan's armor has saved countless American lives. The company also sells to police and border guard forces worldwide. A special vehicle built for the military police of São Paulo, capable of transporting 24 fighters and equipped with diurnal and nocturnal vision systems was used during the Olympics in Brazil.

Sasa's innovations include vehicular cabin, chassis and hull armor kits to protect personnel and equipment on MaxxPro, MRAP (Mine Resistant and Ambush Protected) and M-ATV (all-terrain) vehicles.

In March 2023, Plasan Sasa announced its intention to establish a local subsidiary in Australia to be named “Plasan-Australia”.

Carbon composites
Plasan has an automotive composite manufacturing facility in Vermont formerly the Automotive division of Vermont Composites. Plasan Carbon manufactures the carbon fiber fenders of the Chevrolet Corvette Z06, and the hood, fenders, roof, roof bow, lower rocker moldings and front splitter of the 2009 ZR1. Plasan also molds the Rear Spoilers, Front Splitters, and Front Dive Planes for the 2008 Viper SRT-10 ACR. Plasan has also built in the past the splitter, Hood Assembly, and Mirror caps for the 2008 Ford Shelby GT500KR.

Awards and recognition
In May 2017, Plasan Sasa and its CEO, Danny Ziv, received the National Defense Industrial Association's Red Ball Express award. The company was recognized by NDIA's Tactical Wheeled Vehicle Division.

Products
Vehicles with armored bodies designed and manufactured by Plasan
 Plasan Sand Cat
 Plasan Guarder
 Oshkosh M-ATV
 International MaxxPro
 International MXT-MVA
 Future Tactical Truck Systems
 Medium Tactical Vehicle Replacement
 Joint Light Tactical Vehicle
 Combat Tactical Vehicle
 HMMWV M1114GR and M1118GR
 Mack Granite
 DAF Tropco
 Freightliner M-915
 Mahindra Rakshak
 Lockheed Martin AVA-1
 Thales Hawkei

See also
Economy of Israel
Science and technology in Israel

References

External links
Company website
$200 million contract with the U.S. Marines

Vehicle manufacturing companies established in 1985
Defense companies of Israel
Military vehicle manufacturers
Privately held companies of Israel
Truck manufacturers of Israel
1985 establishments in Israel